Nepal B (sometimes referred to as Nepal Blue) is a secondary football team run occasionally as support for the Nepal national football team, who are also known as Nepal Red when the two teams play simultaneously. At times they have played other nations' full teams; they have also played matches against 'B' teams from other football associations.

History
During the 1987 Quaid-E-Azam International Cup, Nepal entered a second string team under the title 'Nepal XI', as the full national team was playing Olympic qualifying matches during this period.

Nepal Blue first made their debut at the 2000 ANFA Coca-Cola Invitational Tournament (along with the A-team, Nepal Red, who were coached by Stephen Constantine). Nepal Blue were drawn into Group A, while Nepal Red ended up in Group B. The tournament began well for Nepal Blue, who won their first match against the Bangladesh Army XI by 2-0. However, their campaign was thwarted by Soongsil (a South Korean university team) at the semi-finals. Soongsil went on to win the tournament.

The side made several returns, most notably at the 2009 Nepal Prime Minister Cup Invitational Tournament, organised by the Republican Sports Federation of Nepal (RSFN). However, the team did not perform as well as in 2000, but finished instead at the bottom of their group after losing to Sri Lanka in their opener. However, Nepal Red managed to scoop the title by winning the finals on penalties.

Competitive record

References

External links
YouTube: Nepal Blue v Sri Lanka (PM Cup 2009)
YouTube: Nepal Red v Arambagh KS (PM Cup 2009)
YouTube: Nepal Red v Pakistan (PM Cup 2009)

1987 establishments in Nepal
B
Association football clubs established in 1987
Asian national B association football teams